Edge of Heaven is a 2014 British sitcom.

Edge of Heaven or The Edge of Heaven may also refer to:

"The Edge of Heaven", a 1986 song by Wham!
The Edge of Heaven (film), a 2007 film by Fatih Akın
"Edge of Heaven" (2 Unlimited song), 1998